Eupithecia petrohue is a moth in the family Geometridae. It is found in the Los Lagos Region (Llanquihue Province) in Chile. The habitat consists of the Valdivian Forest Biotic Province.

The length of the forewings is about 8.5 mm for males. The forewings are dark grey, with a greyish black triangular mark on the costa. The basal area is greyish black. The hindwings are even dark grey, slightly darkened along the anal margin. Adults have been recorded on wing in January.

Etymology
The specific name is based on the type locality.

References

Moths described in 1987
petrohue
Moths of South America
Endemic fauna of Chile